Williamsburg Cinemas is a first-run multiplex theater located in Williamsburg, Brooklyn in New York City, on the corner of Grand Street and Driggs Avenue. Williamsburg Cinemas has seven theaters inside of it, is 19,000 square-feet wide, a concession stand, and has stadium-seating.

History
In early 2012, Harvey Elgart, the owner of Brooklyn's Cobble Hill Cinemas, contracted with developer Blue Zees to build Williamsburg Cinemas. The multiplex is owned by Elgart's son, Andrew Elgart.

Construction of the Williamsburg Cinemas multiplex was finished in 2012, and it officially opened on December 19, 2012.

Williamsburg Cinemas has served as the site of many movie premieres since its opening, including that of the 2015 Fantastic Four film, which premiered at the multiplex on August 4, 2015.

Features
Williamsburg Cinemas has been praised for its 7.1 Dolby Digital surround sound system, as well as its stadium seating.

References

Williamsburg, Brooklyn
2012 establishments in New York City
Cinemas and movie theaters in New York City
Grand Street and Grand Avenue